Edward Cyril Castle, Baron Castle, (5 May 1907 – 26 December 1979) was a British journalist and Labour Party politician. Between 1975 and 1979 he was a Member of the European Parliament. He was married to Barbara Castle, a member of the House of Commons for 34 years, and one of Labour's most prominent figures, serving in multiple cabinet positions.

Early life
Castle, the son of Frederick J Castle of Foxcombe Hill, Oxford, attended Abingdon School from 1918 to 1920  as well as Portsmouth Grammar School and, after completing his school education, began working as a journalist.

Journalistic career
He became news editor at the Manchester Evening News, in 1932, before leaving in 1943 to become the night editor for the Daily Mirror.

During this time he met the young Labour politician Barbara Anne Betts, whom he married in July 1944.

In 1944 he became deputy editor-in-chief of the Picture Post and, later, its editor and publisher, before being succeeded by Tom Hopkinson.

Political career
Castle started his own political career in 1964. In that year the first elections to the Greater London Council (GLC) were held. He was chosen by the Labour Party group on the GLC to be an alderman, serving a six-year term until 1970. He also was an alderman of the council of the London Borough of Islington.

By a Letters Patent of 18 June 1974 he was created a life peer with the title Baron Castle, of Islington in Greater London, and was a member of the House of Lords until his death.

From 3 July 1975 until his death in 1979 he served as a Member of the European Parliament, and was one of the first representatives of the Labour Party in the European Parliament.

See also
 List of Old Abingdonians

References

External links
 Entry in Hansard
 Entry in Cracroft's Peerage
 Entry in The Peerage
 Entry in Spartacus Educational

1907 births
1979 deaths
Daily Mirror people
English newspaper editors
Labour Party (UK) MEPs
Labour Party (UK) life peers
MEPs for the United Kingdom 1973–1979
People educated at Abingdon School
People educated at The Portsmouth Grammar School
People from Oxford
Spouses of life peers
Life peers created by Elizabeth II